Arianna Bridi (born 6 November 1995) is an Italian swimmer.

She competed in the 25 km open water event at the 2018 European Aquatics Championships, winning the gold medal.

Achievements

References

External links
 Arianna Bridi profile at FIN web site 

1995 births
Living people
Italian female freestyle swimmers
European Aquatics Championships medalists in swimming
Italian female long-distance swimmers
Swimmers of Gruppo Sportivo Esercito
Sportspeople from Trento
Universiade medalists in swimming
Universiade gold medalists for Italy
Medalists at the 2015 Summer Universiade
21st-century Italian women